Oreta ancora is a moth in the family Drepanidae. It was described by Hong-Fu Chu and Lin-Yao Wang in 1987. It is found in China (Sichuan, Tibet) and Nepal.

The length of the forewings is 16–19 mm. Adults are similar to Oreta angularis, but the outer margin of the forewings is convex, not forming a triangle and there are two prominent oblique dark lines on the hindwings, as well as an oval dark spot in the cell.

References

Moths described in 1987
Drepaninae